The Song Rising is a 2017 supernatural dystopian novel by British writer Samantha Shannon, the third in The Bone Season series.

Plot synopsis 
Newly crowned as Underqueen, Paige Mahoney has a great deal to worry about: Jaxon, who has revealed himself as a traitor, has vowed vengeance against her. Scion has stepped up its hunt for "unnaturals"—deploying the new technology Senshield throughout the city, meaning that voyants can be automatically detected. She must also maintain her tenuous alliance with the Ranthen—the Rephaim opposing the Sargas, as the Emim, immortal enemies of the Rephaim, begin to appear in London. Her quest to fight back against Scion takes her out of London, to the Scion bastions of Manchester and Edinburgh, and by the end of the story, it seems her journey will take her further still. Readers get more insight into the characters of the Seven Seals, Paige's "gang", while her relationship with Warden seems to be ever more elusive.

Reception 
Kirkus Reviews calls The Song Rising "never less than captivating," and "a tantalizing, otherworldy adventure with imagination that burns like fire." Publishers Weekly finds that the "narrative is fueled by a constant sense of tension, as well as both internal and external conflict," and yet that "some of the mythology related to the otherworldly Rephaim remains hard to grasp, somewhat diminishing the story’s overall strength." The Scotsman reviewer is particularly impressed with how Shannon evokes the cities and places in the novel, and  that the narrative of The Song Rising, including scenes of torture and deprivation, "make this series of books easily the most politically engaged of any of the contemporary dystopian fantasies."

References

External links 

 

2017 British novels
2017 fantasy novels
Dystopian novels
Novels set in the future
Novels set in Manchester
Novels set in Edinburgh
Bloomsbury Publishing books